Ilocano (also Ilokano; ;) is an Austronesian language spoken in the Philippines, primarily by Ilocano people and as a lingua franca by the Igorot people and also by the native settlers of Cagayan Valley. It is the third most-spoken native language in the country.

As an Austronesian language, it is related to Malay (Indonesian and Malaysian), Tetum, Chamorro, Fijian, Māori, Hawaiian, Samoan, Tahitian, Paiwan, and Malagasy. It is closely related to some of the other Austronesian languages of Northern Luzon, and has slight mutual intelligibility with the Balangao language and the eastern dialects of the Bontoc language.

The Ilokano people had their indigenous writing system and script known as kur-itan. There have been proposals to revive the kur-itan script by teaching it in Ilokano-majority public and private schools in Ilocos Norte and Ilocos Sur.

Classification 
Ilocano, like all Philippine languages, is an Austronesian language, a very expansive language family believed to originate in Taiwan. Ilocano comprises its own branch within the Philippine Cordilleran language subfamily. It is spoken as a first language by seven million people.

A lingua franca of Northern Luzon and many parts of Central Luzon, it is spoken as a secondary language by more than two million people who are native speakers of Ibanag, Ivatan, Pangasinan, Sambal, and other local languages.

Geographic distribution 

The language is spoken in the Ilocos Region, the Babuyan Islands, the Cordillera Administrative Region, Cagayan Valley, northern parts of Central Luzon, Batanes, some areas in Mindoro, and scattered areas in Mindanao (particularly the Soccsksargen region). The language is also spoken in the United States, with Hawaii and California having the largest number of speakers, and in Canada. It is the third most spoken non-English language in Hawaii after Tagalog and Japanese, spoken by 17% of those speaking languages other than English at home (25.4% of the population).

In September 2012, the province of La Union passed an ordinance recognizing Ilocano (Iloko) as an official provincial language, alongside Filipino, the national language, and English, a co-official language nationwide. It is the first province in the Philippines to pass an ordinance protecting and revitalizing a native language, although there are other languages spoken in La Union, including Pangasinan, Kankanaey, and Ibaloi.

Writing system

Modern alphabet 
The modern Ilokano alphabet consists of 28 letters:

Aa, Bb, Cc, Dd, Ee, Ff, Gg, Hh, Ii, Jj, Kk, Ll, Mm, Nn, Ññ, NGng, Oo, Pp, Qq, Rr, Ss, Tt, Uu, Vv, Ww, Xx, Yy, and Zz

Pre-colonial 
Pre-colonial Ilocano people of all classes wrote in a syllabic system known as Baybayin prior to European arrival. They used a system that is termed as an abugida, or an alphasyllabary. It was similar to the Tagalog and Pangasinan scripts, where each character represented a consonant-vowel, or CV, sequence. The Ilocano version, however, was the first to designate coda consonants with a diacritic mark – a cross or virama – shown in the Doctrina Cristiana of 1621, one of the earliest surviving Ilokano publications. Before the addition of the virama, writers had no way to designate coda consonants. The reader, on the other hand, had to guess whether a consonant not succeeding a vowel is read or not, for it is not written. Vowel apostrophes interchange between e or i, and o or u.

Modern 

In recent times, there have been two systems in use: the Spanish system and the Tagalog system. In the Spanish system words of Spanish origin kept their spellings. Native words, on the other hand, conformed to the Spanish rules of spelling. Most older generations of Ilocanos use the Spanish system.

In the system based on that of Tagalog there is more of a phoneme-to-letter correspondence, which better reflects the actual pronunciation of the word. The letters ng constitute a digraph and count as a single letter, following n in alphabetization. As a result,  ('humility') appears before  ('to chew') in newer dictionaries. Words of foreign origin, most notably those from Spanish, need to be changed in spelling to better reflect Ilocano phonology. Words of English origin may or may not conform to this orthography. A prime example using this system is the weekly magazine Bannawag.

Samples of the two systems 
The following are two versions of the Lord's Prayer. The one on the left is written using Spanish-based orthography, while the one on the right uses the Tagalog-based system.

Comparison between the two systems

Notes

1. In Ilocano phonology, the labiodental fricative sound // does not exist. Its approximate sound is //. Therefore, in words of Spanish or English origin, // becomes //. In particular (yet not always the case), last names beginning with // are often said with //, for example Fernández /per.'nan.des/.

2. The sound // only occurs in loanwords, and in the negative variant haan.

Ilocano and education 
With the implementation by the Spanish of the Bilingual Education System of 1897, Ilocano, together with the other seven major languages (those that have at least a million speakers), was allowed to be used as a medium of instruction until the second grade. It is recognized by the Commission on the Filipino Language as one of the major languages of the Philippines. Constitutionally, Ilocano is an auxiliary official language in the regions where it is spoken and serves as auxiliary media of instruction therein.

In 2009, the Department of Education instituted Department Order No. 74, s. 2009 stipulating that "mother tongue-based multilingual education" would be implemented. In 2012, Department Order No. 16, s. 2012 stipulated that the mother tongue-based multilingual system was to be implemented for Kindergarten to Grade 3 Effective School Year 2012–2013. Ilocano is used in public schools mostly in the Ilocos Region and the Cordilleras. It is the primary medium of instruction from Kindergarten to Grade 3 (except for the Filipino and English subjects) and is also a separate subject from Grade 1 to Grade 3. Thereafter, English and Filipino are introduced as mediums of instructions.

Literature 

Ilocano animistic past offers a rich background in folklore, mythology and superstition (see Religion in the Philippines). There are many stories of good and malevolent spirits and beings. Its creation mythology centers on the giants Aran and her husband Angalo, and Namarsua (the Creator).

The epic story Biag ni Lam-ang (The Life of Lam-ang) is undoubtedly one of the few indigenous stories from the Philippines that survived colonialism, although much of it is now acculturated and shows many foreign elements in the retelling. It reflects values important to traditional Ilokano society; it is a hero's journey steeped in courage, loyalty, pragmatism, honor, and ancestral and familial bonds.

Ilocano culture revolves around life rituals, festivities, and oral history. These were celebrated in songs, dances, poems, riddles, proverbs, literary verbal jousts called  (named after the writer Pedro Bucaneg, and is the equivalent of the Balagtasan of the Tagalogs), and epic stories.

Phonology

Segmental

Vowels 
Modern Ilocano has two dialects, which are differentiated only by the way the letter e is pronounced. In the Amianan (Northern) dialect, there exist only five vowels while the older Abagatan (Southern) dialect employs six.

Reduplicate vowels are not slurred together, but voiced separately with an intervening glottal stop:
 :  'no'
 :  'thorn'

The letter in bold is the graphic (written) representation of the vowel.

For a better rendition of vowel distribution, please refer to the IPA Vowel Chart.

Unstressed /a/ is pronounced  in all positions except final syllables, like   ('cannot be') but  ('mouth') is pronounced .

Although the modern (Tagalog) writing system is largely phonetic, there are some notable conventions.

O/U and I/E 
In native morphemes, the close back rounded vowel  is written differently depending on the syllable. If the vowel occurs in the ultima of the morpheme, it is written o; elsewhere, u.

Example:

 Root:  'cook'
  'to cook'
  'to cook (something)'; example: 

In words of foreign origin, notably Spanish, they are phonemic.Example:  'use';  'bear'

Unlike u and o, i and e are not allophones, but i in final stressed syllables in words ending in consonants can be , like   ('child').

The two closed vowels become glides when followed by another vowel. The close back rounded vowel  becomes  before another vowel; and the close front unrounded vowel , .Example:   'money';   'bitter melon'

In addition, dental/alveolar consonants become palatalized before . (See Consonants below).

 Pronunciation of  

 Diphthongs 

Diphthongs are combination of a vowel and /i/ or /u/. In the orthography, the secondary vowels (underlying /i/ or /u/) are written with their corresponding glide, y or w, respectively. Of all the possible combinations, only /aj/ or /ej/, /iw/, /aw/ and /uj/ occur. In the orthography, vowels in sequence such as uo and ai, do not coalesce into a diphthong, rather, they are pronounced with an intervening glottal stop, for example,  'hair'  and  'sew' .

Other occurrences are in words of Spanish and English origin.

 Consonants 

All consonantal phonemes except  may be a syllable onset or coda. The phoneme  is a borrowed sound (except in the negative variant haan) and rarely occurs in coda position. As a result, both  and  occur.

The glottal stop  is not permissible as coda; it can only occur as onset. Even as an onset, the glottal stop disappears in affixation. Take, for example, the root  , 'use'. In a reduplicated form, the glottal stop returns and participates in the template, CVC,  . Glottal stop  sometimes occurs nonphonemically in coda in words ending in vowels, but only before a pause.

Stops are pronounced without aspiration. When they occur as coda, they are not released, for example,   'answer', 'response'. 

The language marginally has a trill  which is spelled as rr, for example,   'to enter'. It is only pronounced flap  in affixation and across word boundaries, especially when vowel-ending word precedes word-initial . But it is different in proper names of foreign origin, mostly Spanish, like Serrano, which is correctly pronounced .

 Prosody 

 Primary stress 
The placement of primary stress is lexical in Ilocano. Primary stress can fall only on either the penult or the ultima of the root, as seen in the previous examples.

While stress is unpredictable in Ilokano, there are notable patterns that can determine where stress will fall depending on the structures of the penult, the ultima and the origin of the word.

 Foreign words – the stress of foreign (mostly Spanish) words adopted into Ilokano fall on the same syllable as the original.

 CVC.'CV(C)# but 'CVŋ.kV(C)# – in words with a closed penult, stress falls on the ultima, except for instances of  where it is the penult.

 'C(j/w)V# – in words whose ultima is a glide plus a vowel, stress falls on the ultima.

 C.'CV:.ʔVC# – in words where VʔV and V is the same vowel for the penult and ultima, the stress falls on the penult.

 Secondary stress 
Secondary stress occurs in the following environments:
 Syllables whose coda is the onset of the next, i.e., the syllable before a geminate.

 Reduplicated consonant-vowel sequence resulting from morphology or lexicon.

 Vowel length 
Vowel length coincides with stressed syllables (primary or secondary) and only on open syllables except for ultimas, for example,  'tree' versus  (second person plural ergative pronoun).

 Stress shift 
As primary stress can fall only on the penult or the ultima, suffixation causes a shift in stress one syllable to the right. The vowel of open penults that result lengthen as a consequence.

 Grammar 

Ilocano is typified by a predicate-initial structure. Verbs and adjectives occur in the first position of the sentence, then the rest of the sentence follows.

Ilocano uses a highly complex list of affixes (prefixes, suffixes, infixes and enclitics) and reduplications to indicate a wide array of grammatical categories. Learning simple root words and corresponding affixes goes a long way in forming cohesive sentences.

 Lexicon   

 Borrowings 
Foreign accretion comes largely from Spanish, followed by English and smatterings of much older accretion from Hokkien (Min Nan), Arabic and Sanskrit.Vanoverbergh, Morice (1956). Iloko-English Dictionary:Rev. Andres Carro's Vocabulario Iloco-Español. Catholic School Press, Congregation of the Immaculate Heart of Mary, Baguio, Philippines. 370pp.

 Common expressions 
Ilokano shows a T-V distinction.

 Numbers, days, months 

 Numbers 

Ilocano uses two number systems, one native and the other derived from Spanish.

Ilocano uses a mixture of native and Spanish numbers.  Traditionally Ilocano numbers are used for quantities and Spanish numbers for time or days and references.
Examples:Spanish:
 
 'How old are you (in years)?' (Lit. 'How many years do you have?')
 
'Twenty one.'

 
 'Open your Bibles to the book of John chapter three verse sixteen.'Ilocano':
 
'How many kilos of rice do you want?'
 
'Ten only.'

 
 'He has two fish.' (lit. 'There are two fish with him.')

Days of the week 
Days of the week are directly borrowed from Spanish.

Months 
Like the days of the week, the names of the months are taken from Spanish.

Units of time 
The names of the units of time are either native or are derived from Spanish. The first entries in the following table are native; the second entries are Spanish derived.

To mention time, Ilocanos use a mixture of Spanish and Ilocano:

 1:00 a.m.                    (one in the morning)
 2:30 p.m.                   , in Spanish:  (half past two in the afternoon)
 6:00 p.m                     (six in the evening)
 7:00 p.m                     (seven in the evening)
 12:00 noon                   (twelve noon)

More Ilocano words 

 = beside; wedding party
 = parents-in-law
 = study (Southern dialect)
 = far
 = affirming the presence or existence of a person, place, or object
 = younger sibling; can also be applied to someone who is younger than the speaker
 = slave
 = to take
 = know
 = perseverance, patience (depends on the usage)
/ = what
 = go; to go
 = fight, argument; ice cream cone
 = why
 = grandparent
// = grandmother
// = grandfather
 = build, work (Southern dialect)
 = door
 = near
 = long
 = none / nothing
/ = oh, Jesus/oh, my God!
 = ancient; old
 = clothes; outfit; shirt
 = one's body; ownership
 = gold
 = same as 
 = spoiled food
 = (to) tell/speak
/ = crazy/bad word in Ilokano, drunk person, meager
 = young female/lass
 = mung beans
 = house
 = infant/child
 = stink/unpleasant/spoiled
 = young male/lad
 = study (Northern dialect); read (Southern dialect)
 = same as 
 = few, small, tiny
 = fault, wrongdoing, sin
 = spank
 = slow
 = sea; bay
 = 25 cents/quarter
 = bladed tool / sword
 = destroy/ruin
 = bad
 = big; large; huge
 = later
 = to arrive at
 = punch
// = wall
 = come
 = spend
 = unripe
 = hundred
 = reach
 = go home
 = simultaneous
 = thunder
 = no
 = holding
 = to give
 = cards
/ = tomorrow
 = niece / nephew
 = horse
 = new
 = loofah
/ = sibling
 = cover
 = always
 = neighbor
 = want
 = wood
 = yellowish brown
 = yellow
 = hold hands
 = startle
 = lightning
 = pinch
 = hoping for
 = mother
 = boast/arrogant
 = light/not heavy
/ = intelligence
 = wide
 = vehicle
 = hate
 = older sister or relative; can also be applied to women a little older than the speaker
 = how many/how much
 = older brother or relative; can also be applied to men a little older than the speaker
 = female friend/mother
 = also, too
 = work (Northern dialect)
 = good morning
 = salty
 = spicy
 = beautiful/pretty (woman)
 = high/above/up
 = leave
 = close male friend
 = priest
 = danger(ous)
 = (to) break/ruin/damage
= tear
 = strength; strong
 = died; passed away
 = wrath
 = root
 = bet, wager
 = window/s
 = wake up
 = hardship
 = start; beginning
 = dirt/not clean
 = weed/s
 = face
 = outside; out
 = broom
 = dance
 = arm wrestling
 = find; need; search
 = (it) hurts
 = noun for fish, main dish, side dish, viand
 = fish bone/thorn
 = kind/obedient
 = corner
 = (to) write
 = dumb
 = sharpness (use for tools)
 = steal
 = coward/afraid
 = hard (texture)
 = eggplant
 = fall down
 = to play music or a musical instrument
 = rude
 = rain
 = (to) sit
 = anything to sit on
 = chair; seat
 = grill
 = inherit(ed); heritage
 = kid; baby; child
 = welcome
 = very much
 = uncle
 = even though/wait
 = me too; even I/me
 = head
 = hen
 = stop it
 = string beans
 = mouse/rat
 = fart
 = yes

Also of note is the yo-yo, probably named after the Ilocano word .

See also 
 Ilokano grammar
 Ilokano numbers
 Ilokano particles
 Ilokano verb

Notes

Citations

References

External links 

 The Online Ilokano Dictionary Project (TOIDP) – A free Ilokano dictionary application for people to utilize so that they may overcome the language barriers existing between the English and Ilokano languages.
 Android Mobile Application - Ilokano Search – A free Android application that allows users to search our database of entries for Ilokano/English translations.
 iOS Mobile Application - Ilokano Search – A free iOS application that allows users to search our database of entries for Ilokano/English translations
 Tarabay iti Ortograpia ti Pagsasao nga Ilokano – A free ebook version of the Guide on the Orthography of the Ilokano Language developed by the Komisyon ng Wikang Filipino (KWF) in consultation with various stakeholders in Ilokano language and culture. Developed back in 2012 as a resource material for the implementation of the Department of Education's K-12 curriculum with the integration of MTB-MLE or Mother Tongue-Based Multilingual Education.
 Bansa.org Ilokano Dictionary 
 Materials in Ilocano from Paradisec
 Ilocano.org A project for building an online Ilokano dictionary. Also features Ilokano songs, and a community forum.
 Ilokano Swadesh vocabulary list
 Ilocano: Ti pagsasao ti amianan – Webpage by linguist Dr. Carl R. Galvez Rubino, author of dictionaries on Iloko and Tagalog.
 Iluko.com popular Ilokano web portal featuring Ilokano songs, Iloko fiction and poetry, Ilokano riddles, and a lively Ilokano forum (Dap-ayan).
 mannurat.com blog of an Ilokano fictionist and poet written in Iloko and featuring original and Iloko fiction and poetry, literary analysis and criticism focused on Ilokano Literature, and literary news about Iloko writing and writers and organization like the GUMIL (Gunglo dagiti Mannurat nga Ilokano).
 samtoy.blogspot.com Yloco Blog maintained by Ilokano writers Raymundo Pascua Addun and Joel Manuel
 Austronesian Basic Vocabulary Database
 dadapilan.com – an Iloko literature portal featuring Iloko works by Ilokano writers and forum for Iloko literary study, criticism and online workshop.
 Vocabularios de la Lengua Ilocana by N.P.S. Agustin, published in 1849.
 Tugot A blog maintained by Ilokano writer Jake Ilac.

 
Ilocano culture
Northern Luzon languages